Siemer is a German surname. Notable people with the surname include:

 Laurentius Siemer (1888–1956), priest
 Oscar Siemer (1901–1959), American baseball player
 Victoria Siemer, American graphic artist

See also
 Siemer House
 Siemers

German-language surnames